Dancing Co-Ed is a 1939 American romantic comedy film directed by S. Sylvan Simon and starring Lana Turner in the titular role, Richard Carlson as an inquisitive college reporter, and bandleader Artie Shaw as himself.

Plot
When a dancer's partner becomes pregnant, a nationwide search is instituted to find a replacement from among college women. A perfect choice is found, but she is not in school, resulting in various hijinks.

Cast
 Lana Turner as Patty Marlow
 Richard Carlson as Michael "Pug" Braddock
 Artie Shaw as himself
 Ann Rutherford as Eve Greeley
 Lee Bowman as Freddy Tobin
 Thurston Hall as Henry W. Workman
 Leon Errol as Sam "Pops" Marlow
 Roscoe Karns as Joe Drews
 Mary Field as Miss Jenny May
 Walter Kingsford as President Cavendish
 Mary Beth Hughes as "Toddy" Tobin
 June Preisser as "Ticky" James
 Monty Woolley as Professor Lange
 Chester Clute as Pee Wee

Veronica Lake and Robert Walker have uncredited parts.

Box office
According to MGM records the film earned $518,000 in the US and Canada and $195,000 elsewhere resulting in a profit of $21,000.

References

External links

 
 
 
 

1930s American films
1930s English-language films
1939 films
1939 romantic comedy films
American black-and-white films
American romantic comedy films
Films directed by S. Sylvan Simon
Films scored by Edward Ward (composer)
Films set in universities and colleges
Metro-Goldwyn-Mayer films